Putnam is a town in Dewey County, Oklahoma, United States. The population was 29 at the 2010 census, down from 46 in 2000. The community lies along U.S. Route 183.

Geography
Putnam is located in southern Dewey County at  (35.856334, -98.968550).

Demographics

As of the census of 2000, there were 46 people, 20 households, and 16 families residing in the town. There were 30 housing units at an average density of 296.8 per square mile (115.8/km2). The racial makeup of the town was 97.83% White and 2.17% Native American. Hispanic or Latino of any race were 2.17% of the population.

There were 20 households, out of which 35.0% had children under the age of 18 living with them, 70.0% were married couples living together, 10.0% had a female householder with no husband present, and 20.0% were non-families. 20.0% of all households were made up of individuals, and 10.0% had someone living alone who was 65 years of age or older. The average household size was 2.30 and the average family size was 2.56.

In the town, the population was spread out, with 21.7% under the age of 18, 28.3% from 25 to 44, 34.8% from 45 to 64, and 15.2% who were 65 years of age or older. The median age was 44 years. For every 100 females, there were 130.0 males. For every 100 females age 18 and over, there were 125.0 males.

The median income for a household in the town was $40,417, and the median income for a family was $42,083. Males had a median income of $16,875 versus $15,625 for females. The per capita income for the town was $17,928. There were no families and 3.4% of the population living below the poverty line, including no under eighteens and none of those over 64.

References

Towns in Dewey County, Oklahoma
Towns in Oklahoma